Gwendoline Riley  (born 19th February 1979)  is an English writer.

Early life and education
Riley was born in London, England, in 1979. She attended Manchester Metropolitan University.

Career 
Riley's first novel, Cold Water, was named one of the five outstanding debut novels of 2002 by The Guardian "Weekend" magazine and also won a Betty Trask Award. 
Sick Notes followed in 2004 and Joshua Spassky in 2007. For Cold Water and Sick Notes, the drama unfolds in Manchester, occasionally extending to different areas of Lancashire. Joshua Spassky, however, is set in Asheville, North Carolina — the town where Zelda Fitzgerald died in a fire at the Highland Hospital. Joshua Spassky won the 2008 Somerset Maugham Award and was shortlisted for the 2007 John Llewellyn Rhys Prize. Her fourth novel, Opposed Positions, was published in May 2012. Her fifth, First Love, was published in February 2017 and was shortlisted for the Baileys Women's Prize for Fiction, the Gordon Burn Prize, the Goldsmiths Prize, the Dylan Thomas Prize and the James Tait Black Memorial Prize. It won the Geoffrey Faber Memorial Prize.

In June 2018 Riley was elected Fellow of the Royal Society of Literature in its "40 Under 40" initiative.

Bibliography 
 Cold Water (novel) (2002)
 Sick Notes (2004)
 Tuesday Nights and Wednesday Mornings: A Novella and Stories (2004)
 Joshua Spassky (2007)
 Opposed Positions (2012)
 First Love (2017)
 My Phantoms (2021)

Awards and honours 
 2002 Betty Trask Award for Cold Water.
 2007 shortlisted for the John Llewellyn Rhys Prize, for Joshua Spassky.
 2008 Somerset Maugham Award, for Joshua Spassky.
 2017 shortlisted for the Baileys Women's Prize for Fiction, for First Love.
 2017 shortlisted for the Gordon Burn Prize, for First Love.
 2017 shortlisted for the Goldsmiths Prize, for First Love.
 2017 shortlisted for the Dylan Thomas Prize, for First Love.
 2017 shortlisted for the James Tait Black Memorial Prize, for First Love.
 2017 Geoffrey Faber Memorial Prize, for First Love.
 2022 shortlisted for the Folio Prize, for My Phantoms.

References

External links
'Dotpod' podcast interview from run-riot.com
Guardian interview (2007)
3:AM Magazine interview (2004)
Times Literary Supplement review of Joshua Spassky, by Paul Owen
Guardian review of Opposed Positions, by Anne Enright
Scotsman review of Opposed Positions, by Stuart Kelly
New York Times review of First Love, by James Lasdun

1979 births
Living people
21st-century English novelists
Alumni of Manchester Metropolitan University
Fellows of the Royal Society of Literature